San Luis Obispo Bay is a bay on the Pacific Ocean coast of San Luis Obispo County, California, about 160 miles (257 km) northwest of Los Angeles, and about  south of San Francisco.  The bay is located between Point San Luis and Shell Beach.  The community of Avila Beach is located on the bay.  San Luis Obispo Creek has its mouth on the bay west of Avila Beach.

References 

Bays of California
Bodies of water of San Luis Obispo County, California